The year 1925 in archaeology involved some significant events.

Explorations

Excavations
 Kaminaljuyu Mayan site, by Manuel Gamino.
 Kültepe in Turkey, by Bedřich Hrozný.
 Excavations in Gibraltar by Dorothy Garrod begin (continue to 1926).
 October - Tin Hinan Tomb in the Sahara located and opened by Byron Khun de Prorok.
 December - Complete excavation of the Great Sphinx of Giza by Émile Baraize begins (continues to 1936).

Publications
 John Beazley - Attische Vasenmaler des rotfigurigen Stils
 V. Gordon Childe - The Dawn of European Civilization.
 Aleš Hrdlička - The Old Americans.

Finds
 July 13 - "Venus of Dolní Věstonice" at Dolní Věstonice in Moravia.
 October 28 - Howard Carter reveals the golden death mask of Tutenkhamun.
 "Venus of Savignano" near Savignano sul Panaro in Italy.
 "Galilee skull" in Mugharet el-Zuttiyeh.
 The Aurignacian settlement site at Breitenbach in Saxony-Anhalt is discovered by local schoolteacher E. Thiersch.
 Belgic pottery at Swarling, Kent.
 Makapansgat pebble in South Africa.

Awards

Miscellaneous

Births
 January 22 - John Davies Evans, English archaeologist and academic (d. 2011)
 April 24 - Leslie Alcock, English archaeologist (d. 2006)
 November 14 - James Mellaart, British archaeologist. (d. 2012)

Deaths
 February 4 - Robert Koldewey, German archaeologist (b. 1855).

References

Archaeology
Archaeology
Archaeology by year